VStar Entertainment Group is a family entertainment production company headquartered in Minneapolis, Minnesota, United States. It produced Sesame Street Live, a live touring stage show based on the television series. It has also produced stage shows based on  Dragon Tales, The Muppets and Muppet Babies, Bear in the Big Blue House, Curious George, Barney & Friends and PAW Patrol.

History

Vee Corporation
Vee Corporation was started on March 14, 1980 from an idea by founder Vincent Egan to produce a live character show just for Sesame Street. At the time, there were only three touring family shows, Ringling Bros. and Barnum & Bailey Circus and two ice shows, Ice Follies and Holiday on Ice. He based it off his time working for the Ice Follies which had a segment with those Sesame Street Muppets. Egan approached Jim Henson's company and Children's Television Workshop, who were interested. He then found an investor in Gordon Stofer, whose Norwest Growth Fund took half ownership in the company for $500,000. Egan refinanced his home mortgage for $25,000 in additional funding. With the funding, Vee was able to sign a licensing agreement with the Children's Television Workshop for the characters.

The first Sesame Street Live show opened in September 1980 at the Metropolitan Sports Center in Bloomington, Minnesota for a five-day run. That show was successful. The following shows in five locations had lackluster attendance costing VEE the profits made in Bloomington. Egan figured that the marketing material was confusing people in those markets as what type of show was not specified. He overhauled the script and marketing while getting his creditors to wait for payments. That Christmas, the show went on to play for four weeks at Madison Square Garden's 4,000-seat Felt Forum in New York City before an audience of 100,000 people.

Around 2000, Egan purchased Norwest Fund's stake in the corporation. He also formed two divisions, Vee Costumes & Creatures and Vee Production Services, to successfully diversify the company.

Blue Star
Sanjay Syal started Blue Star Productions before 1995 to produce trade shows. Where Syal produced over 100 events per year, Syal then formed Blue Star Media in 2011 for the traveling exhibition, Discover the Dinosaurs, which became one of the most successful traveling family events in the country with over 120 event per year. With the success of the exhibition, Syal then proceeded to wind down Blue Star Productions as contracts expired. Blue Star Media then started to look for a partner finding AUA Private Equity, who purchase a share of the company from Syal in early June 2014 via a leverage buyout. A tented version of the Discover exhibition was launched in 2014 at two state fairs, New York State Fair, and the California State Fair, and had 14% of total yearly attendance for the exhibition.

VStar Entertainment Group

On April 1, 2015, Blue Star Media, LLC under the direction of Sanjay Syal as CEO purchased VEE Corporation with Egan continuing as a consultant.
In 2015, VEE Corporation and Blue Star Media, a producer and promoter of consumer shows and events, became VStar Entertainment Group. In August 2015, the company agreed to partner with the Pro Football Hall of Fame for a mobile tour. In April 2016, Vstar hired Eric Grilly as CEO from Comcast Sports Group.

In November 2016, Sesame Workshop announced an agreement with Feld Entertainment for a new Sesame Street Live show thus ending VStar's arena version in July 2017. The company continues to support and produce other Sesame Street shows at various locations and the United Service Organizations tour while still providing costumes.

In January 2017, Vstar acquired Cirque Productions, based in South Florida. Neil Goldberg, Cirque Productions founder and Broadway director, was retained as president of Cirque Dreams.

Aftermath
On July 5, 2018, Cirque du Soleil Entertainment Group announced that it was acquiring VStar.

Productions

Muppets:
Sesame Street Live (September 17, 1980 – July 2017) (a longer list of Sesame Street Live is at this page.)
Sesame Street, Beaches Resorts
Sesame Street, SeaWorld theme parks
Sesame Street, Sesame Place in Middletown Township, Pa.
United Service Organizations tour
The Muppet Show
on tour 1 (1984-1985)
on tour 2 (1985-1986)
Muppet Babies: 
Muppet Babies Live (1986-1987)
Muppet Babies' Magic Box (1987-1988)
Where's Animal? (1988-1990)
Bear in the Big Blue House (January 8, 1999 - May 16, 2004)

Cirque Dreams

Cirque Dreams Holidaze (2007–present)
Cirque Jungle Fantasy
Cirque Dreams & Dinner, two Norwegian Cruise Line shows
Cirque Dreams Rocks
Cirque Dreams Unwrapped
Cirque Dreams Revealed

Nickelodeon
PAW Patrol Live! (2016- )
Bubble Guppies Live! Ready to Rock (2017-2018)

Nick Jr.
Nick Jr. Live! Move To The Music (2019-2022)

Others
Curious George Live (2009-2010; Canada 2010-2011)
Discover the Dinosaurs  (December 2011) Blue Star Media 
 tented version (2014-) held at fairs
 Ice Age exhibit (December 2014- ) adds on to the main exhibition
 stage show,  adds on to the main show
Unleashed
My Little Pony Live (2006-2008)
Dragon Tales Live (2001-2006)
Care Bears Live! (2004-2006)
Kidz Bop World Tour (2007-2008)
Barney Live in Concert – Birthday Bash! (November 19, 2010 - December 2011)
Hello Kitty's Supercute Friendship Festival (May 29, 2015-2016)
Trolls Live! (November 16, 2019-2022)
The Creature Cases On Stage (Spring 2023)
The Sun-Maid Live Show! (Spring 2023)
Luo Bao Bei Live on stage (Spring 2023)
Alma’s Way Live (Spring 2023)
Rosie’s Rules Live (Spring 2023)

Sports
 "Honor the Heroes" tour (October 17, 2015-) football Hall of Fame inductees on the tour included Tim Brown, Joe Greene,  Charles Haley, Randall McDaniel, Warren Moon and Fran Tarkenton. Tour consisted of four attractions: Legacy Hall, Traditions Stage, Impact Zone and Hall of Fame Locker Room, a store. The hall has holographic busts, football memorabilia and feature multimedia stores. The stage had NFL Films large-screen productions plus "chalk talk" sessions and hourly kids press conferences. The Zone is a football skill and activities test area.
NBA Jam

My First VStar
 Cutie City (Spring 2023)
 Girl Power (Spring 2023)
 Sweetie Bat (Spring 2023)
 Stick Figure Town (Spring 2023)
 Kiko the Sweet Kitty (Spring 2023)
 Toni and her magic purse (Spring 2023)
 Pony Pals (Spring 2023)
 Kat and Kit (Spring 2023)
 Rainbow Buddies (Spring 2023)
 Hola, Amigos! (Spring 2023)
 Mimi in the sweet world (Spring 2023)
 Dokiann (Summer 2023)
 Ruby’s Adventures (Summer 2023)
 Nini and Lili (Summer 2023)

Units
VStar Production Services: creates and manufactures exhibits, props and sets for corporate and entertainment events and museums
VStar Costumes & Creatures: creates and manufactures costumes and puppets for special events, sports teams and other stage productions.

Notes

References

External links
 

Companies based in Minneapolis
Entertainment companies established in 1980
1980 establishments in the United States
American companies established in 1980